Gabriel Naouri (born July 6, 1981) is a French CEO and entrepreneur. He is the founder and CEO of Majorelle Investments (co-controlled with Apollo Capital Management). He was previously deputy head of international operations of Groupe Casino and the co-founder and Chairman of Yandex.Market, one the leading e-commerce player in Russia.

Biography

Education 

Gabriel Naouri graduated from the Université Paris Dauphine (France) with a master's degree in applied mathematics. He later enrolled in the “Global Leadership and Public Policy” program at Harvard University in 2011. Gabriel Naouri is a certified board member from Sciences Po Paris and NYSE Euronext.

Early career 

In 2004, Gabriel Naouri joined the M&A department of Rothschild & Cie Banque in New York City.

He then become a marketing manager in the Consumer Products division of L’Oréal USA Garnier in New York City.

Groupe Casino 

Gabriel Naouri joined Groupe Casino in 2007. Since his start at Groupe Casino, he went through different operational stages alike the Michelin model. He started at a Géant Casino Hypermarket in Rennes, where he held different positions. successively as baker, butcher, checkout employee, cleaner, etc. Throughout those training years, Gabriel Naouri attended the traditional Casino training program at the Group headquarters in Saint-Etienne. After becoming fruits and vegetables section manager at Géant Casino of Mandelieu-La-Napoule, he was successively appointed as executive director at the Géant Casino of Fenouillet (Toulouse) and then as head of operations of the hypermarket division in France.

In June 2012, Gabriel Naouri was appointed head of brand, digital, and innovation of the Casino Group in France. He created and led the launch of several private label brands, including Doodingues – inaugurating the industry's first augmented reality program for children – and Casino Délices, in collaboration with the Michelin-starred chef Michel Troisgros. In Paris in 2012, Gabriel Naouri developed and implemented the first store fully equipped with “near-field communication” (NFC) technology end-to-end. He then designed the click and collect solution for Géant Casino food e-commerce operations and oversaw the deployment of Casino Drive in all hypermarkets across France.

From 2014 to 2017, he served as Deputy head of international operations (12 000 stores) of Groupe Casino. In this role, Gabriel Naouri was responsible for the launch and coordination of international action plans in line with the group strategy. In addition, he has created and launched businesses for Groupe Casino, such as e-commerce player Cdiscount in Thailand and Vietnam. Over the course of this period, he was Casino's representative director on the boards of Big C supercenter in Thailand, Big C Vietnam and of hypermercados Libertad in Argentina.

On July 5, 2017, French media covered his involvement with the US private equity fund Advent International, in relation to the acquisition of the British retail chain The Body Shop and speculated about his imminent departure from Groupe Casino. After 10 years with Groupe Casino, Gabriel Naouri chose to leave the company in July 2017, to “give a new direction to his career.”

New technology 

In late 2017, Gabriel Naouri was appointed Senior Advisor to the Chief Executive Officer of Æon Group, the largest Japanese retailer ($75bn in revenue for 2017) headquartered in Chiba, Japan. In August 2018, Gabriel Naouri co-led a $111M financing round with the Æon Group in Boxed.com, a leading e-commerce player in the United States. Boxed.com is often considered as the “Costco for millennials.”

Yandex 

Gabriel Naouri is a founding board member and chairman of Yandex.Market, until December 2020, one of the leading online marketplace player in Russia often considered as the Russian Amazon, founded by Arkady Volozoh, the CEO and founder of Yandex.

In April 2018, Gabriel Naouri helped the company to raise $500m and officially launch its operations.

In June 2021, Arkady Volozoh bought back Yandex.Market for $1.5bn.

Maisons du Monde 

In August 2020, Majorelle Investments – an investment holding company co-controlled by Gabriel Naouri and Daniel Kretinsky – announces owning more than 5% of Maisons du Monde. The company, a leading European omnichannel home décor player is listed on the French stock market.

In March 2021, Majorelle Investments declares owning more than 10% of the company.

In November2021, Gabriel Naouri and Apollo Global Management bought back Daniel Kretinsky’s stake in Majorelle Investments.

In March 2022, Majorelle Investments announces owning more than 16% of Maisons du Monde.

Honours 

Gabriel Naouri has received several awards for his experiences and accomplishments in France and abroad.

 Elected Young Global Leader in 2008 by the World Economic Forum (2008)
 Named among the 30 most influential people in their 30s by the Optimum Magazine (2009, 2010, 2011, 2012)
 Named among the 100 economic leaders of tomorrow by Le Figaro Magazine (2013, 2014, 2015, 2016, 2017, 2018, 2019, 2020, 2021)

Non executive positions 

 Chairman of the Board of Yandex.Market
 Board member of Tictrac Ltd
 Chairman of the Board of Majorelle Investments

References 

French businesspeople
Living people
1981 births